In mathematics, an ordered vector space or partially ordered vector space is a vector space equipped with a partial order that is compatible with the vector space operations.

Definition

  implies 
  implies  

The two axioms imply that translations and positive homotheties are automorphisms of the order structure and the mapping  is an isomorphism to the dual order structure. Ordered vector spaces are ordered groups under their addition operation.
Note that  if and only if

Positive cones and their equivalence to orderings

A subset  of a vector space  is called a cone if for all real    A cone is called pointed if it contains the origin. A cone  is convex if and only if  The intersection of any non-empty family of cones (resp. convex cones) is again a cone (resp. convex cone); 
the same is true of the union of an increasing (under set inclusion) family of cones (resp. convex cones). A cone  in a vector space  is said to be generating if  
A positive cone is generating if and only if it is a directed set under  

The elements of the positive cone are called positive. 
the positive cone of this resulting preordered vector space is  
There is thus a one-to-one correspondence between pointed convex cones with vertex  and vector preorders on  

Explicitly,  is a proper cone if (1)  (2)  for all  and (3)  
The intersection of any non-empty family of proper cones is again a proper cone.

By a total vector ordering on  we mean a total order on  that is compatible with the vector space structure of  
The family of total vector orderings on a vector space  is in one-to-one correspondence with the family of all proper cones that are maximal under set inclusion. 
A total vector ordering cannot be Archimedean if its dimension, when considered as a vector space over the reals, is greater than 1. 

Examples

The real numbers with the usual ordering form a totally ordered vector space. For all integers  the Euclidean space  considered as a vector space over the reals with the lexicographic ordering forms a preordered vector space whose order is Archimedean if and only if .

Pointwise order

Spaces that are typically assigned this order include:
 the space  of bounded real-valued maps on 
 the space  of real-valued sequences that converge to  
 the space  of continuous real-valued functions on a topological space 
 for any non-negative integer  the Euclidean space  when considered as the space  where  is given the discrete topology.

The space  of all measurable almost-everywhere bounded real-valued maps on  where the preorder is defined for all  by  if and only if  almost everywhere.

Intervals and the order bound dual

An order interval in a preordered vector space is set of the form 

From axioms 1 and 2 above it follows that  and  implies  belongs to  
thus these order intervals are convex.  
A subset is said to be order bounded if it is contained in some order interval. 
In a preordered real vector space, if for  then the interval of the form   is balanced. 
An order unit of a preordered vector space is any element  such that the set  is absorbing. 

If a space is ordered then its order bound dual is a vector subspace of its algebraic dual. 

Examples

If  is a preordered vector space over the reals with order unit  then the map  is a sublinear functional.

Properties

If  is a preordered vector space then for all  

  and  imply 
  if and only if 
  and  imply 
  if and only if  if and only if 
  exists if and only if  exists, in which case 
  exists if and only if  exists, in which case for all 
  and 
 
 
  is a vector lattice if and only if  exists for all

Spaces of linear maps

A cone  is said to be generating if  is equal to the whole vector space. 

Positive functionals and the order dual

A linear function  on a preordered vector space is called positive if it satisfies either of the following equivalent conditions: 

  implies 
 if  then 

The order dual of an ordered vector space  is the set, denoted by  defined by  
Although  there do exist ordered vector spaces for which set equality does  hold.

Special types of ordered vector spaces

Let  be an ordered vector space.
A topological vector space (TVS) that is an ordered vector space is necessarily Archimedean if its positive cone is closed. 

We say that a preordered vector space  is regularly ordered and that its order is regular if it is Archimedean ordered and  distinguishes points in  
This property guarantees that there are sufficiently many positive linear forms to be able to successfully use the tools of duality to study ordered vector spaces. 

An ordered vector space is called a vector lattice if for all elements  and  the supremum  and infimum  exist.

Subspaces, quotients, and products

Throughout let  be a preordered vector space with positive cone  

Subspaces

If  is a vector subspace of  then the canonical ordering on  induced by 's positive cone  is the partial order induced by the pointed convex cone  where this cone is proper if  is proper. 

Quotient space

Let  be a vector subspace of an ordered vector space   be the canonical projection, and let  
Then  is a cone in  that induces a canonical preordering on the quotient space  
If  is a proper cone in then  makes  into an ordered vector space. 
If  is -saturated then  defines the canonical order of  
Note that  provides an example of an ordered vector space where  is not a proper cone. 

If  is also a topological vector space (TVS) and if for each neighborhood  of the origin in  there exists a neighborhood  of the origin such that  then  is a normal cone for the quotient topology. 

Product

If  is any set then the space  of all functions from  into  is canonically ordered by the proper cone  

 is a proper cone if all  are proper cones. 

Algebraic direct sum

If  are ordered vector subspaces of an ordered vector space  then  is the ordered direct sum of these subspaces if the canonical algebraic isomorphism of  onto  (with the canonical product order) is an order isomorphism.

Examples

 The real numbers with the usual order is an ordered vector space. 
  is an ordered vector space with the  relation defined in any of the following ways (in order of increasing strength, that is, decreasing sets of pairs):
 Lexicographical order:  if and only if  or  This is a total order.
This is a partial order.
This is also a partial order.
Only the second order is, as a subset of  closed; see partial orders in topological spaces.
For the third order the two-dimensional "intervals"  are open sets which generate the topology.
  is an ordered vector space with the  relation defined similarly. For example, for the second order mentioned above:
  if and only if  for  
 A Riesz space is an ordered vector space where the order gives rise to a lattice.
 The space of continuous functions on  where  if and only if  for all  in

See also

References

Bibliography

 
 Bourbaki, Nicolas; Elements of Mathematics: Topological Vector Spaces; .
  
  
  

Functional analysis
Ordered groups
Vector spaces